James Allen "Babe" Brown (July 31, 1900 – June 23, 1965) was an American football and basketball coach and college athletics administrator. He was the head coach in basketball and football at the University of Idaho in Moscow, and later a three-sport coach and athletic director at the College of Idaho in Caldwell. He also coached multiple sports at four high schools in Idaho: Lewiston, Burley, Moscow, and Nampa.

Early years
Born in the farming community of Star in southwestern Idaho, Brown graduated from Boise High School in 1919 and was a multi-sport athlete at the University of Idaho in Moscow, where he lettered in football, wrestling, and baseball. He was a hard-hitting fullback on the football team under head coaches Thomas Kelley and R.L. "Matty" Mathews. His senior season was Idaho's first as a member of the Pacific Coast Conference. He was also a member of Kappa Sigma fraternity.

Coaching career
Following his playing days, Brown was an assistant at Idaho under Mathews, then became a high school coach in 1925 at Lewiston High School, and won the state title in basketball in 1926. After several years with the Bengals, he left coaching for two years to work in private business in southern Idaho, then returned to coaching in 1932 at Burley High School for three seasons. He returned to north Idaho to coach at Moscow High School in 1935, taking over the Bears' program from Gale Mix.

Idaho
After six years at MHS, Brown was hired across town as the freshman football coach at the University of Idaho in 1941. Brown moved up to the varsity as an assistant to head coach Francis Schmidt in 1942, but the football program went on hiatus prior to the 1943 season. In the meantime, he became acting head basketball coach in December 1942 and acting athletic director in 1943, when Guy Wicks and George Greene joined the navy. Brown led the UI basketball team to the northern division title of the PCC in his fourth and final season in 1946. The Vandals met southern division winner California in a three-game series in Berkeley; Idaho lost game one in a near-riot, won game two, but lost the third. After Schmidt's death in September 1944, Brown was the interim head coach for the abbreviated 1945 football season and was named head coach in March 1946. The Vandals posted one win in each of the two seasons for an overall 2-15 record  and Brown resigned at the end of November.

After a dozen years residing in Moscow and six years as a collegiate coach, Brown returned to the high school level in 1947 back in southwestern Idaho at Nampa High School, where his teams won titles in football and basketball during his nine seasons with the Bulldogs. His 1950 basketball team won the state championship.

College of Idaho
In 1956, Brown was hired at the College of Idaho in Caldwell as athletic director, and also served as the head coach for basketball and baseball. When head football coach Ed Troxel resigned in 1958 to go to the new Borah High School in Boise, Brown took over as head football coach of the Coyotes. He stepped down as head basketball coach in 1961, and as football coach and athletic director following the 1964 football season.

Brown died in his sleep at age 64 of an apparent heart attack in June 1965 at his home in Caldwell, a week before his official retirement date. He and his wife LaVerne (1898–1961) are buried at Hillcrest Memorial Gardens in Caldwell.

Head coaching record

College football

College basketball

References

External links
 Gem of the Mountains University of Idaho yearbook, 1942, Vandal coaches, p. 64
 

1900 births
1965 deaths
Basketball coaches from Idaho
College of Idaho Coyotes baseball coaches
College of Idaho Coyotes football coaches
College of Idaho Coyotes men's basketball coaches
Idaho Vandals athletic directors
Idaho Vandals baseball coaches
Idaho Vandals baseball players
Idaho Vandals football coaches
Idaho Vandals football players
Idaho Vandals men's basketball coaches
High school basketball coaches in Idaho
High school football coaches in Idaho
People from Star, Idaho
Players of American football from Idaho
People from Caldwell, Idaho